Elena Yanovna Braverman (née Lumelskaya) is a Russian, Israeli, and Canadian mathematician known for her research in delay differential equations, difference equations, and population dynamics. She is a professor of mathematics and applied mathematics at the University of Calgary, and one of the editors-in-chief of the journal Advances in Difference Equations.

Education and career
Braverman is originally from the Soviet Union, and earned bachelor's and master's degrees at Perm State University in 1981 and 1983 respectively. She defended her Ph.D. at Ural State University in 1990. Her dissertation, Linear impulsive functional differential equations, was supervised by Nikolai V. Azbelev.

In 1992, she emigrated to Israel, where she took a postdoctoral research position at the Technion – Israel Institute of Technology. She remained in Israel for most of the following decade, with teaching positions at the Technion and at the ORT Braude College of Engineering.

After visiting Yale University in 2001–2002, she moved to her present position at the University of Calgary in 2002. She was tenured there in 2007 and promoted to full professor in 2011.

Book
Braverman is a co-author of the book Nonoscillation Theory of Functional Differential Equations with Applications (with Ravi P. Agarwal, Leonid Berezansky, and Alexander Domoshnitsky, Springer, 2012).

Family
Braverman is the daughter of mathematical statistician . Braverman's mother, Ludmila Mikhailovna Tsirulnikova, was also a university-level physics teacher, whose father was Soviet weapons engineer .
Braverman is the mother of theoretical computer scientist Mark Braverman.

References

External links
Home page

Year of birth missing (living people)
Living people
Russian mathematicians
Israeli mathematicians
Canadian mathematicians
Women mathematicians
Perm State University alumni
Ural State University alumni
Academic staff of Technion – Israel Institute of Technology
Academic staff of the University of Calgary